The 1947 Bulgarian Cup Final was the 7th final of the Bulgarian Cup (in this period the tournament was named Cup of the Soviet Army), and was contested between Levski Sofia and Botev Plovdiv on 1 June 1947 at Yunak Stadium in Sofia. Levski Sofia won the final 1–0.

Match

Details

See also
1947 Bulgarian Republic Football Championship

References

Bulgarian Cup finals
Botev Plovdiv matches
PFC Levski Sofia matches
Cup Final